The People's Representative Council of Aceh (abbreviated to DPR Aceh or DPRA) is the unicameral regional legislature of the Indonesian province of Aceh. Unlike other regional legislatures in Indonesia in general, it has unique characteristics according to Act No. 11 of 2005 on Aceh Government; such as unique name, more council members (1¼ times more than ordinary regional legislatures), and include Aceh regional parties. The council seats in Aceh's capital Banda Aceh.

The DPRA has 81 members who are elected through general elections every five years. The DPRA leadership consists of a speaker and 3 deputy speakers who come from political parties with the most number of seats and votes. The current DPRA members are the results of 2019 general election which was sworn in on September 30, 2019 by the chairperson of Banda Aceh High Court, Djumali, at the main building of the DPRA. DPRA members for the 2019-2024 period consists of 15 political parties, where the Aceh Party has most seats, namely 18 seats.</onlyinclude>

References

External links 
 DPRA official website

Aceh
Politics of Aceh